Aggry beads (also spelled aggri beads or aggrey beads) are a type of decorated glass bead from Ghana, used by West Africans as ornaments in necklaces, bracelets and other jewelry.

Aggry beads are also called Koli, Cori, Kor, Segi, Accori, or Ekeur.

They are often used for medicinal purposes, as it is believed that they have magical powers.

Beads were used for exchange and as a means of payment during trade in Africa. Europeans first collected aggry beads from the West Coast of Africa in the fifteenth century.

Their origin is obscure. Depending on different sources, beads labelled such may be made from glass, coral, or stone, and were typically blue. It is possible that the original Aggry beads came from the Phoenicians, who used it as a means of trading along the coasts of Europa, Asia and Africa.

Sometimes millefiori beads are called "Aggrey", but this may be incorrect.

References

External links
KettenE
History of Aggrey Beads

Beadwork